Lester B. Pearson United World College of the Pacific (Also referred to as Pearson College UWC) is one of eighteen schools and colleges around the world in the United World Colleges movement, located on Vancouver Island, Canada. It is named after the late Canadian Prime Minister Lester Bowles Pearson, winner of the 1957 Nobel Peace Prize, and an early champion of the college. The mission of the UWC movement and of the school is to "make education a force to unite people, nations and cultures for peace and a sustainable future".

About 100 students are selected for each annual intake for the two-year program. In 2022-23, students represented 94 countries and territories. The college offers the International Baccalaureate diploma, and a Career-related Programme (CP) curriculum pathway in the Climate Action Leadership Diploma program. Both pathways incorporate experiential education approaches for students generally aged 16 to 19. The current president and head of college is Craig Davis.

History 

Lester B. Pearson, Nobel Peace Prize Laureate and former prime minister of Canada, was the driving force behind the founding of Pearson College UWC. After retiring from public life, Pearson became interested in the United World Colleges movement. At that time, only one United World College existed — Atlantic College in Wales, established in 1962. Pearson visited Atlantic College in 1969 and there, met with students and faculty. He came away convinced that there must be more such colleges around the world and, in particular, one on Canada's west coast. He envisioned that:“Students will be welcomed without regard to race, religion or politics and we intend to establish scholarships so that the students who attend the College will be from all levels of society and will be genuine representatives of their own peoples. This system … could become a revolutionary force in international education.”Lester B. Pearson became honorary chairman of a committee formed to build what was to be known as the College of the Pacific. He worked tirelessly in the early days of the planning process, but died in December 1972, just as the project was getting underway. Soon after his death, it was decided that the college would be renamed Lester B. Pearson College of the Pacific as a living memorial to his legacy. The Hon. John L. Nichol, CC, was chosen as initial chairman of the board of trustees and a major fundraising effort began, with over $4 million raised—83% coming from individuals, corporations and foundations across Canada and around the world, and the remaining 17% from governments around the world. Ground broke on the college's construction on Sep. 25, 1973.

Over the next year, Jack Matthews, the founding director of the college, recruited a faculty of men and women from around the globe, and on Sep. 25, 1974, the inaugural cohort of 100 students arrived. An official opening the following year was attended by Lord Mountbatten, Jean Chretien, and Charles, Prince of Wales. Since then, up to 200 students have attended each year. Pearson College UWC continues to be funded through individuals, alumni, corporations, foundations, select provincial and local governments in Canada and some UWC donors.

Today, more than 4,300 students have graduated from Pearson College UWC. Alumni have built careers in a variety of sectors and professions in every corner of the globe.

Academics and administration 
The College's main academic curriculum follows the International Baccalaureate Diploma Programme – Pearson was the first school in Canada to adopt the IB Diploma Programme. Students are also required to participate in community-oriented services, cultural activities, and physical fitness. A highlight of the academic year is the student-driven, professional-level dance, music and cultural show, "One World", which attracts audiences from Victoria and surrounding communities.

Admission
All UWC students are selected based on their merit, promise and potential. Each of the nearly 160 United World College National Committees makes recommendations for admission to UWC schools independently and according to their individual selection procedures. Admission is competitive and is deliberately intended to reflect diversity in all respects. Sponsorship to fund scholarships that help make it possible for more students to attend Pearson comes from a variety of organizations, foundations, governments and individual donors.

Campus

The college is located on the shores of Pedder Bay, near Victoria, British Columbia on Vancouver Island, on the traditional territory of the Sc'ianew (Beecher Bay) First Nation. The college provides an excellent location for environmental studies thanks to the surrounding woodlands and the nearby Race Rocks Marine Protected Area, an ecological conservation area maintained by the college. Pearson works in partnership with BC Parks, the Canadian Coast Guard and several other committed parties to ensure a resident volunteer Ecoguardian is always present on Race Rocks.

The college has five residence houses that accommodate all students in four-person dorm rooms and, in a connected apartment, resident "houseparents." Houseparents can include some faculty and staff of the college. All student residence houses accommodate male and female students on separate floors and are equipped with common dayroom for study and relaxation. Campus facilities also include a large dining hall, an indoor swimming pool and fitness facility, a large library with study and classroom areas, a student commons building, two theatre-style seating lecture halls as well as traditional classrooms, labs and a floating marine sciences building.

The college's proximity to Pedder Bay allows a broad range of waterfront programs. A fleet of sail boats, kayaks, canoes, and Scuba diving equipment are also stored on the docks and in the floating marine sciences building. Students can access activities only after appropriate training.

Graduates

Recent graduates have placed in some of the world's top universities, and some alumni have become notable leaders in human rights, international development, charitable organizations, business, law, science and other fields. Students from Pearson go on to study in post-secondary institutions around the world including, for example, institutions such as Brown University, Harvard University, McGill University, The University of Oxford, Columbia University, King's College London, Sciences Po, and the University of Toronto, and as well as Earlham College, Wageningen University, and New York University.

Seventeen graduating students have been selected as Loran Scholars, the highest number of any single secondary school, and 15 graduates have been awarded Rhodes Scholarships. After graduation, students are eligible to participate in the Davis United World College Scholars Program, which funds undergraduate study based on need at select American universities. In a recent year, the graduating class of Pearson College UWC was collectively awarded $12.5 million in scholarships.

Notable alumni 
 Evan Adams, Canadian actor and Deputy Provincial Health Officer for British Columbia
 Ramy Adeeb, founder and CEO of social curation platform Snip.it
 Douglas Alexander, British Member of Parliament (MP) and Shadow Foreign Secretary. From 2007 until 2010, Secretary of State for International Development in Gordon Brown's cabinet
 Wendy Alexander, Member of the Scottish Parliament and leader of the Scottish Labour Party in 2007–2008
 Shauna Aminath, Maldives Minister of the Environment, Climate Change, and Technology Maldivian Democratic Party
 Nicolette Bethel, Bahamian Anthropologist, professor in the School of Social Sciences at the University of The Bahamas, and former director of culture in The Bahamas.
Oluwatoyin Asojo, Nigerian Scientist 
Menzie Chinn, professor of public affairs and economics at University of Wisconsin–Madison.
 Jane Clarke, poet
 Paul Colton, Bishop of Cork, Cloyne and Ross
 Nicholas Dawes, Executive Director of The City
 Louise Patricia Edwards, Emeritus Professor of Chinese History at the University of New South Wales
 Anne Enright, 2007 Man Booker Prize-winning novelist
 Lene Espersen, former Danish Minister of Foreign Affairs and former Deputy Prime Minister
Meera Gandhi, founder and chief executive officer of The Giving Back Foundation 
Massimiliano Gioni, director of exhibitions at the New Museum, curator of 55th Venice Biennale, art director of Fondazione Nicola Trussardi
Tamar Herzog, Monroe Gutman Professor of Latin American Affairs at Harvard University, Affiliated Faculty at Harvard Law School
Nakkiah Lui, Aboriginal-Australian writer and actor, New South Wales Premier's Literary Award-winning playwright, Co-writer and star of Black Comedy.
 Mira Murati, CTO at OpenAI
 Latif Nasser, co-host of Radiolab, and host of the Netflix series Connected
Fionnuala Ní Aoláin, Irish academic lawyer specialising in human rights law and founder and associate director of the Transitional Justice Institute at the University of Ulster
John Ofori-Tenkorang, Ghanaian public servant, an investment banker, an engineer and an academic
Jenny Ohlsson, Swedish diplomat, ambassador to Rwanda
Todd Sampson, chief executive of Leo Burnett Australia and television personality on Gruen Planet
Peter Sands, executive director of The Global Fund to Fight AIDS, Tuberculosis and Malaria; former CEO, Standard Chartered Bank
 Craig Scott, Canadian Member of Parliament (MP) and former professor of law at Osgoode Hall Law School
 Richard Underhill, Canadian Jazz saxophonist and Juno Award winner
 Federico Varese: Professor of Criminology, Head of Sociology Department, Oxford University
 Peter Willcock, justice of the British Columbia Court of Appeal
 Abiodun Williams, president of The Hague Institute for Global Justice
Yuen Pau Woo, president and CEO of the Asia Pacific Foundation of Canada

References

External links 
  Official Site
 

High schools in British Columbia
International Baccalaureate schools in British Columbia
Educational institutions established in 1974
1974 establishments in British Columbia